Segreto is a surname. Notable people with the surname include:

Affonso Segreto (1875–?), Brazilian filmmaker
Ric Segreto (1952–1998), American-born Filipino singer recording artist, singer-songwriter, actor, teacher, journalist, and historian